Renata Voráčová and Lenka Wienerová were the defending champions, having won the event in 2012, but both players decided not to participate that year.

Qualifiers Alice Balducci and Katarzyna Kawa won the title, defeating fourth seeds Diana Buzean and Christina Shakovets in the final, 3–6, 7–6(7–3), [10–8].

Seeds

Draw

References 
 Draw

Trofeul Popeci - Doubles
Trofeul Popeci